Coming Home or Comin' Home may refer to:

Film
 Coming Home (1962 film), a South Korean film starring Choi Moo-ryong
 Coming Home (1978 film), an American film directed by Hal Ashby
 Coming Home (2011 film), a film featuring Ankur Bhatia
 Coming Home (2012 film), a French film directed by Frédéric Videau
 Coming Home (2014 film), a Chinese film directed by Zhang Yimou
 Coming Home (2018 film), an Argentine film directed and written by Ricardo Preve

Literature 
 Coming Home (Cohen novel), 1945 novel by Lester Cohen
Coming Home (McDevitt novel), 2014 science-fiction novel by Jack McDevitt
 Coming Home, 1995 novel by Rosamunde Pilcher
 Coming Home, 2009 play by Athol Fugard

Music

Albums 
 Coming Home (Aleksander With album), 2006
 Coming Home (Leon Bridges album), 2015
 Coming Home (Kristin Chenoweth album), 2014
 Coming Home (Raymond Cilliers album), 2016
 Coming Home (Falling in Reverse album), 2017
 Coming Home (Yungchen Lhamo album), 1998
 Coming Home (Lonestar album), 2005
 Coming Home (The Nadas album), 2000
 Coming Home (New Found Glory album), 2006
 Coming Home (O'Connor Band album), 2016
 Coming Home (Pain album), 2016
 Coming Home (Lionel Richie album), 2006
 Coming Home (The Soldiers album), 2009
 Coming Home (Faye Wong album), 1992
 Coming Home (EP), 1998 EP by Iron Savior
 Comin' Home (EP), 2014 EP by Jessie James Decker
 Comin' Home (Larry Coryell album), 1984
 Coming Home, 2010 album by Boozoo Bajou
 Coming Home, 2009 album by Nightmares on Wax
 Coming Home, 2008 album by Danny Wood
 Coming Home, 1998 album by Joe Grushecky

Songs 
 "Coming Home" / "Coming Home (To Richmond)" (Alex Lloyd songs), 2003 / 2014
 "Coming Home" (Busted song), 2016
 "Coming Home" (Cinderella song), 1989
 "Coming Home" (Diddy – Dirty Money song), 2010
 "Coming Home" (Firelight song), 2014
 "Coming Home" (Kaiser Chiefs song), 2014
 "Coming Home" (Keith Urban song), 2018
 "Coming Home" (K-Warren song), 2001
 "Coming Home" (Lemar song), 2010
 "Coming Home" (Leon Bridges song), 2015
 "Coming Home" (Sasha song), 2006
 "Coming Home" (Sjonni's Friends song), 2011
 "Coming Home" (The Soldiers song), 2009
 "Coming Home" (Sigma and Rita Ora song), 2015
 "Coming Home" (Sheppard song), 2017
 "Comin' Home" (City and Colour song), 2006
 "Comin' Home" (Hum song), 1998
 "Comin' Home" (The Radiators song), 1979
 "Coming Home (Jeanny Part 2)" by Falco, 1986
 "Major Tom (Coming Home)", by Peter Schilling
 "Coming Home", by Alex Band from Alex Band EP
 "Coming Home", by Alter Bridge from Blackbird
 "Coming Home", by Aly & Fila featuring Jwaydan
 "Coming Home", by Armin van Buuren from Mirage
 "Coming Home", by Avenged Sevenfold from Hail to the King
 "Coming Home", by Axel Rudi Pell from Shadow Zone
 "Coming Home", by DJ Tiësto from Parade of the Athletes
 "Coming Home", by Ian Thomas from Still Here
 "Coming Home", by Enrique Iglesias from Euphoria
 "Coming Home", by Eric Saade
 "Coming Home", by Gwyneth Paltrow from the Country Strong film soundtrack
 "Coming Home", by Iron Maiden from The Final Frontier
 "Coming Home", by Iron Savior from Unification
 "Coming Home", by James LaBrie from Static Impulse
 "Coming Home", by John Legend from Once Again
 "Coming Home", by King Diamond from Them
 "Coming Home", by Little Richard from Pray Along with Little Richard
 "Coming Home", by Marit Larsen from Spark
 "Coming Home", by The Mavis's from Rapture
 "Coming Home", by Megadeth from The World Needs a Hero
 "Coming Home", by Pain from Coming Home
 "Coming Home", by Pixie Lott from Turn It Up Louder
 "Coming Home", by Saxon from Killing Ground
 "Coming Home", by Scorpions from Love at First Sting
 "Coming Home", by Shane Filan of Westlife from You and Me
 "Coming Home", by Stratovarius from Visions
 "Coming Home", by SWV from It's About Time
 "Coming Home", by U.D.O. from Animal House
 "Comin' Home", by Bob Seger from The Distance
 "Comin' Home", by Cheeseburger
 "Comin' Home", by Danger Danger from Screw It!
 "Comin' Home", by Delaney & Bonnie from On Tour with Eric Clapton
 "Comin' Home", by Deep Purple from Come Taste the Band
 "Comin' Home", by Kiss from Hotter Than Hell
 "Comin' Home", by Lynyrd Skynyrd from The Essential Lynyrd Skynyrd
 "Comin' Home", by Prism from Armageddon
 "Comin' Home", by Talisman from Genesis

Television 
 Coming Home (TV serial), a two-part 1998 British serial based on Rosamund Pilcher's novel that aired on ITV
 Coming Home (British TV series), a 2004 British documentary series that aired on BBC Wales
 Coming Home (American TV series), a 2011 American reality series that aired on Lifetime
 Coming Home (miniseries), a 2003 miniseries produced by John Drimmer
 "Coming Home" (advertisement), or the "Folgers Incest Ad", a 2009 commercial for Folgers Coffee

Episodes 
 "Coming Home" (The Dead Zone)
 "Coming Home" (Desperate Housewives)
 "Coming Home" (Mobile Suit Gundam)
 "Coming Home" (Xena: Warrior Princess)

Other uses 
 Coming Home campaign, a UK program to aid military personnel returning from Afghanistan and Iraq

See also 
 Homecoming (disambiguation)
 Come Home (disambiguation)
 Going Home (disambiguation)
 I'm Coming Home (disambiguation)